American singer-songwriter Lana Del Rey has recorded songs for six studio albums, three extended plays (EPs), as well as guest features. Her debut EP Kill Kill (2008) was released by 5 Points Records under her birth name Elizabeth "Lizzy" Grant; its tracks "Kill Kill" and "Yayo" were written solely by Grant, while the remaining song "Gramma (Blue Ribbon Sparkler Trailer Heaven)" was co-written by Grant and David Kahne. She assumed the stage name Lana Del Ray for her debut studio album Lana Del Ray (2010) and wrote the majority of the record by herself, although Kahne is credited with co-writing four tracks on the project.

Grant, who by this point had adopted her current stage name Lana Del Rey, signed a recording contract with Stranger Records in 2011; she released her debut single "Video Games", which she co-wrote with Justin Parker, that year. After the commercial success of the track, Del Rey signed a recording contract with Interscope Records and Polydor Records for the release of her major-label debut Born to Die (2012). The album reached number one in eleven countries and was certified Platinum in eighteen. The songs on Born to Die were written by Del Rey in collaboration with Justin Parker, Tim Larcombe, Emile Haynie, Dan Heath, Mike Daly, The Nexus, Rick Nowels, Chris Braide, Jim Irvin, Sacha Skarbek, Liam Howe, and Hannah Robinson.

Del Rey followed Born to Die with an EP called Paradise in November 2012. The EP featured a cover of the song "Blue Velvet", written by Bernie Wayne and Lee Morris, and a re-recording of "Yayo". The rest of the songs were written by Del Rey with contributions by Justin Parker, Rick Nowels, Emile Haynie, Tim Larcombe and Dan Heath. In 2013, Del Rey contributed the song "Young and Beautiful" to the soundtrack of Baz Luhrmann's 2013 film adaptation of The Great Gatsby. She also recorded a cover of the song "Once Upon a Dream", originally written by Sammy Fain and Jack Lawrence, for the soundtrack of the dark fantasy film Maleficent (2014).

Del Rey's third studio album, Ultraviolence, was released in the summer of 2014. Debuting at number one in twelve countries, as of June 2014, it has been certified Gold in Canada, and Silver in the United Kingdom. The album featured a cover of the song "The Other Woman", written by Jessie Mae Robinson. The other songs on the album were written by Del Rey in collaboration with Blake Stranathan, Dan Heath, Rick Nowels, Barrie O’Neill, Greg Kurstin, Robbie Fitzsimmons, Dan Auerbach, and Harmony Korine. In the same year, she also contributed the songs "Big Eyes" and "I Can Fly" to the soundtrack of Tim Burton's biographical film Big Eyes, which focuses on the American artist Margaret Keane. The songs were co-written by Dan Heath and Rick Nowels, respectively. Del Rey collaborated with Emile Haynie on the song "Wait for Life" for his debut album We Fall in 2015.

Del Rey is featured on "Prisoner" from The Weeknd's Beauty Behind the Madness, which was released in August 2015. Her fourth studio album, Honeymoon was released in September 2015 and was preceded by the release of the singles "High by the Beach", "Music To Watch Boys To" and "Terrence Loves You". Twelve of the album's tracks were collaborations between Del Rey and Rick Nowels. "High by the Beach" has additional writing credits from Kieron Menzies. A cover of "Don't Let Me Be Misunderstood", originally recorded by Nina Simone and written by Bennie Benjamin, Gloria Caldwell and Sol Marcus, is included in the album, and "Burnt Norton (Interlude)" features Del Rey reciting T. S. Eliot's 1936 poem Burnt Norton. 

Del Rey provided uncredited backing vocals on "Party Monster" and was featured on an interlude entitled "Stargirl Interlude" from The Weeknd's Starboy released in 2016. Del Rey released her fifth studio album Lust for Life on July 21 2017, preceded by the singles "Love" and "Lust for Life". Del Rey collaborated with artists The Weeknd, ASAP Rocky, Playboi Carti, Stevie Nicks and Sean Ono Lennon on various songs on the album. Rick Nowels returns to the album, having writing credits in fourteen out of sixteen songs on the album. Benjamin Levin and Emilie Haynie have writing credits on the lead single from the album, "Love". The Weeknd has writing and vocal credits on the titular song of the album. Canadian record producer Boi-1da, ASAP Rocky, Playboi Carti, Tyler Williams, Jahaan Sweet and Andrew Joseph Gradwohl Jr. all have writing credits on the sixth song from the album, "Summer Bummer". ASAP Rocky returns on seventh track on the album, "Groupie Love", with writing and vocal credits. Justin Parker and Stevie Nicks both have writing credits on the song "Beautiful People Beautiful Problems", with Nicks also having vocal credits. Sean Ono Lennon has writing and vocal credits on the thirteenth song on the album, "Tomorrow Never Came".

Songs

Notes 

  Del Rey provided background vocals on "Ghetto Baby", "Live My Life", "Lover's Fate", "Party Monster",and "Blue Madonna" but is not credited as a featured artist on the official track listings.

See also
 List of unreleased songs by Lana Del Rey

References 

 
Del Rey, Lana